Augustine Bernard Kelley (July 9, 1883 – November 20, 1957) was an American politician who served as a Democratic member of the U.S. House of Representatives from Pennsylvania from 1941 to 1957.

Life and career
Kelley was born in New Baltimore, Pennsylvania.  He attended the United States Military Academy in West Point, New York, in 1904 and 1905, but had to withdraw because of a heart condition.  He studied mining engineering with the International Correspondence School from 1907 to 1912.  He began his business career in 1905 as a clerk with the Pennsylvania Railroad Company, and later became superintendent of the H.C. Frick Coke Company.  He was also associated with other coke and coal companies.  He served as a member of the Greensburg, Pennsylvania, Board of Education in 1935 and 1936.

Kelley was elected as a Democrat to the Seventy-seventh and to the eight succeeding Congresses and served until his death in Bethesda, Maryland.  In Congress he served as Chairman of the United States House Committee on Invalid Pensions during the 79th United States Congress.  He is interred in Arlington National Cemetery.

See also
 List of United States Congress members who died in office (1950–99)

References

The Political Graveyard

1883 births
1957 deaths
Burials at Arlington National Cemetery
United States Military Academy alumni
Democratic Party members of the United States House of Representatives from Pennsylvania
School board members in Pennsylvania
20th-century American politicians